Secondary fermentation may refer to:

Secondary fermentation (wine) - a second fermentation in wine-making
Secondary fermentation - a second fermentation in brewing beer